Adrienne Lyle (born 2 January 1985 in Coupeville, Washington) is an American Olympic dressage rider. Representing the United States, she competed at the 2012 Summer Olympics in London where she finished 37th in the individual competition, and the 2020 Summer Olympics in Tokyo where she was won a silver medal in the team competition. After qualifying for the individual Grand Prix Freestyle at the 2020 Olympics she withdrew from the competition out of concern for her horse, Salvino.

She also competed at the 2014 FEI World Equestrian Games in Normandy, France, where she achieved 4th place in team dressage.  Four years later at the 2018 FEI World Equestrian Games she won a silver medal in the team event.

International Championship Results

References

External links
 
 
 
 

1985 births
Living people
American female equestrians
American dressage riders
Equestrians at the 2012 Summer Olympics
Equestrians at the 2020 Summer Olympics
Olympic equestrians of the United States
Sportspeople from Washington (state)
People from Coupeville, Washington
Medalists at the 2020 Summer Olympics
Olympic silver medalists for the United States in equestrian
21st-century American women